Erkki Talosela (22 June 1921 – 2 December 2010) was a Finnish wrestler. He competed at the 1948 Summer Olympics and the 1952 Summer Olympics.

References

External links
 

1921 births
2010 deaths
Finnish male sport wrestlers
Olympic wrestlers of Finland
Wrestlers at the 1948 Summer Olympics
Wrestlers at the 1952 Summer Olympics
People from Lapua
Sportspeople from South Ostrobothnia